Byrrhus is a genus of pill beetles in the family Byrrhidae. There are at least 30 described species in Byrrhus.

The correct date for this genus is 1767  (#195), as it was not listed in 1758. B. pilula (Linnaeus, 1758) was listed under the genus Dermestes in the 10th edition (#18).

Species
These 32 species belong to the genus Byrrhus:

 Byrrhus alpinus Gory, 1829 g
 Byrrhus americanus LeConte, 1850 i c g b
 Byrrhus arietinus Steffahny, 1842 g
 Byrrhus auromicans Kiesenwetter, 1851 g
 Byrrhus concolor Kirby, 1837 i c g b
 Byrrhus crenulatus Rossi, 1794 g
 Byrrhus cyclophorus Kirby, 1837 i c g b
 Byrrhus derrei Allemand, 1987 g
 Byrrhus espanoli G.Fiori, 1960 g
 Byrrhus eximius LeConte, 1850 i c g b
 Byrrhus fasciatus Forster, 1771 i c g
 Byrrhus focarilei Fabbri & Puetz, 1997 g
 Byrrhus geminatus LeConte, 1854 i c g b
 Byrrhus gigas Fabricius, 1787 g
 Byrrhus glabratus Heer, 1841 g
 Byrrhus kirbyi LeConte, 1854 i c g b
 Byrrhus lisellae (G.Fiori, 1953) g
 Byrrhus luniger Germar, 1817 g
 Byrrhus murinus Fabricius, 1794 g
 Byrrhus nicolasi G.Fiori, 1966 g
 Byrrhus nigrosparsus Chevrolat, 1866 g
 Byrrhus numidicus Normand, 1935 g
 Byrrhus occidentalis G.Fiori, 1953 g
 Byrrhus picipes Duftschmid, 1825 g
 Byrrhus pilosellus A.Villa & G.B.Villa, 1833 g
 Byrrhus pilula (Linnaeus, 1758) i c g b
 Byrrhus pustulatus (Forster, 1771) g
 Byrrhus pyrenaeus Dufour, 1834 g
 Byrrhus rubidus Kugelann, 1792 g
 Byrrhus rufipes Kugelann, 1792 g
 Byrrhus signatus Sturm, 1823 g
 Byrrhus undulatus Kugelann, 1792 g

Data sources: i = ITIS, c = Catalogue of Life, g = GBIF, b = Bugguide.net

References

Further reading

External links

 

Byrrhidae
Articles created by Qbugbot